The Spy Who Loved Me may refer to:

 The Spy Who Loved Me (novel), the 1962 novel by Ian Fleming
 The Spy Who Loved Me (film), the 1977 film named after the novel
 James Bond, The Spy Who Loved Me, the novelization of the film by Christopher Wood
 The Spy Who Loved Me (video game), the computer game based on the film
 The Spy Who Loved Me (soundtrack), the soundtrack to the film composed by Marvin Hamlisch